Matthew Flinders Girls' Secondary College is an all-girls State secondary school located in Geelong, Victoria, Australia. It provides education for students years 7-12.

History
The school opened as Flinders National Grammar School in January 1858. The foundation stone was laid on 5 December 1856 by the administrator of the Colony of Victoria, Colonel Edward Macarthur. It is believed that the architect involved was local, German-born  architect, Frank Kawerau, of Ryrie Street, Geelong, who also designed many government buildings across Victoria, including Willsmere (formerly Kew Lunatic Asylum (1864)), which has very similar architecture. The school was to be named the Geelong National Grammar School but, at the foundation ceremony, Macarthur asked permission to name it the "Flinders National Grammar School", after Captain Matthew Flinders, the first European explorer to circumnavigate Australia, who climbed the local You Yangs and described the Geelong area.

When the school opened in January 1858, 116 boys were enrolled, but there was no room for girls. Falling enrolments forced the school to become coeducational in 1864. The school was extended and remodelled in December 1879, due to increased student numbers. When the extensions were opened in April 1880, it was known as Flinders State School no. 260. The school was unofficially known as 'Link's School', after fifth headmaster George Link, who was in charge from 1879 to 1894. During that time enrolments increased to 1000 students.

By 1938, enrolments were still increasing but there was not enough space. As a result, the decision was made in 1939 for the school to become "Matthew Flinders Girls School", under Ada Knowles. The school was led by Frances Higgins from 1942 to 1947. In 1948, it was said to be "dilapidated", and "a dumping ground" for girls who would work in the mills as soon as they were fourteen. At that point the school appointed Minnie Elizabeth Cawthorn as the new head. She decided that the students should not be trained as housewives but to have a life. The school became the "Matthew Flinders Girls School" and the grounds were pristine. In 1950, the first students to sit the "Girls' Leaving Certificate" in Victoria were at the school. In 1956, Mary Lausza became the new head of the school.

In 1966, under Dr J. S. Bowden, the school gained high school status and it was renamed "Matthew Flinders Girls High School". The school is now called Matthew Flinders Girls Secondary College.

Today

The college operates on two campuses.  Years 7, 10, 11 and 12 students are located on the Main Campus, whilst Years 8 and 9 are on the smaller Helen Fraser Campus.

References

External links

Matthew Flinders Girls Secondary College
 Kids Voice Magazine
 Peter Begg (1990). Geelong - The First 150 Years. Globe Press. 

Girls' schools in Victoria (Australia)
Educational institutions established in 1940
Schools in Geelong
Heritage-listed buildings in Greater Geelong
1940 establishments in Australia